Domingo Jean Luisa is a former professional baseball pitcher.

Professional career

White Sox 
He began his professional career with the GCL White Sox the following season, and in  pitched for the South Bend White Sox. On January 10,  Jean was traded to the Yankees as part of a package for Steve Sax.

Yankees 
Jean was assigned to the Fort Lauderdale Yankees to start the 1992 season. He pitched most of the year there, although at the end of the season he was promoted to the Double-A Albany-Colonie Yankees for one start.

In , Jean split the year between three minor league levels before making his major league debut on August 8. He started that day's game against the Minnesota Twins, pitching 6.2 innings and giving up four runs. Although Jean did not get a decision, the Yankees won the game 8–6. In his next start on August 14th he was set to make his Yankee stadium debut on Reggie Jackson day against the Baltimore Orioles and got stuck in traffic on the George Washington bridge so he got out of the cab and ran on foot to yankee stadium and made it a half hour before first pitch, he pitched 5 innings giving up 2 runs in a no decision yankees would win the game 4-2 He earned his lone major league win on August 20 over the Kansas City Royals, pitching 7 innings and giving up just two runs. He finished the season with a record of 1–1 with a 4.46 ERA. Jean was the last active New York Yankee player to wear number 42 before Mariano Rivera donned it in 1995.

After the season, Jean was traded to the Houston Astros along with fan favorite Andy Stankiewicz for pitcher Xavier Hernandez.

Minor league journeyman 
Jean opened the 1994 season in the minor leagues with the Triple-A Tucson Toros. However, due to injuries, he appeared in just six games. The following year, he started the season with Tucson, but was traded to the Texas Rangers in May. He was assigned to the Oklahoma City 89ers, where he pitched as both a starter and reliever. However, he was just 3–8 with an ERA of 6.14. Late in the season, he was acquired by the Cincinnati Reds organization, where appeared in two games for the Indianapolis Indians.

In , Jean was converted to a full-time reliever. He spent most of the year with the Double-A Chattanooga Lookouts, where he compiled 31 saves in just 39 games. He returned to Chattanooga the following year, but after posting an ERA of 9.75 in 10 games he was let go.

In , he returned to the Yankees' organization, where he spent the next three seasons between the Double-A Norwich Navigators and Triple-A Columbus Clippers. In , Jean pitched his final professional season with the Langosteros de Cancún of the Mexican League.

Notes

Sources

1969 births
Living people
Albany-Colonie Yankees players
Bridgeport Bluefish players
Chattanooga Lookouts players
Colorado Springs Sky Sox players
Columbus Clippers players
Dominican Republic expatriate baseball players in Mexico
Dominican Republic expatriate baseball players in the United States
Dominican Republic people of Haitian descent
Fort Lauderdale Yankees players
Gulf Coast White Sox players
Indianapolis Indians players
Langosteros de Cancún players
Major League Baseball pitchers
Major League Baseball players from the Dominican Republic
Mexican League baseball pitchers
New Haven Ravens players
New York Yankees players
Norwich Navigators players
Oklahoma City 89ers players
Prince William Cannons players
South Bend White Sox players
Sportspeople of Haitian descent
Tucson Toros players